Anaís (born Ana Isabel Salazar on July 26, 1974) is a Mexican actress.

Early life
Anaís was born July 26, 1974, in Culiacán, Sinaloa, Mexico. She studied up to the fourth semester of Law Faculty of the University of Culiacan, until she discovers her talent for acting, so she has participated in telenovelas Bajo un mismo rostro, Tú y yo, Huracán and El Privilegio de Amar. In addition to television, Anaís has also participated in theater, starred as Doña Inés in Don Juan Tenorio and Cinderella in the play of the same name.

In 2002 hosted on television program  El club. In 2003 hosted on television daily TV Show Hoy then with Laura Flores, Arturo Peniche and Patrick Cabezut and later alongside Andrea Legarreta and Ernesto Laguardia. In 2006 played as special appearance in the telenovela La Fea Más Bella. Later she played in the telenovelas Código Postal, Pasión, Camaleones and La que no podía amar.

Filmography

References

External links

 	

1974 births
Living people
Mexican telenovela actresses
Mexican television actresses
Mexican stage actresses
Mexican television talk show hosts
Mexican television presenters
Actresses from Sinaloa
20th-century Mexican actresses
21st-century Mexican actresses
People from Culiacán
Mexican women television presenters